The John and Anna Wywialowski Farmstead is located in Armstrong Creek, Wisconsin.

History
John Wywialowski and his wife Anna purchased the farm in 1936. They used to expand their dairy and potato farm, as they had already owned the adjacent property. It was added to the State and the National Register of Historic Places in 2016.

References

Farms on the National Register of Historic Places in Wisconsin
National Register of Historic Places in Forest County, Wisconsin
Late 19th and Early 20th Century American Movements architecture